Bring It On, Ghost is a South Korean television series starring Ok Taec-yeon, Kim So-hyun and Kwon Yul. It is adapted from webtoon of the same name which was serialised on Naver from 2007 to 2010. The series aired on cable network tvN on Mondays and Tuesdays at 23:00 (KST) time slot for 16 episodes from 11 July to 30 August 2016. The series was well-received domestically and internationally. It was ranked as the ninth most watched cable drama in Korea during 2016.

Synopsis
Park Bong-pal (Ok Taec-yeon) has grown up with the ability to see ghosts. He uses his power to work as an exorcist, banishing ghosts in order to make enough money to undergo a procedure that will take his ability away. At a haunted high school, he encounters Kim Hyun-ji (Kim So-hyun) a feisty high school student who, because of a traffic accident, became a wandering spirit. Hyun-ji believes that Bong-pal might hold the secret as to why she is a spirit. In order to be freed from endlessly wandering the earth and be able to ascend to the next life, Hyun-ji convinces Bong-pal to let her move in, and the two become ghost fighting partners.

With Hyun-ji, Bong-pal finds that he can fight even stronger ghosts, but also learns that not all ghosts are malevolent. Working and living together, Bong-pal, a long time loner, finds himself falling in love with Hyun-ji, who returns his feelings. However, both are unaware that they are being stalked by an evil spirit that was the cause of Hyun-ji's accident, and is the reason Bong-pal can see ghosts.

Cast

Main
 Ok Taec-yeon as Park Bong-pal
 Lee Seung-woo as young Bong-pal
The male protagonist. Bong-pal is a 23-year-old Economics student and he lived with an exorcist. He can see and interact with ghosts, whom he beats up into leaving their haunts. Due to his ability, he grew up avoiding people and was always a loner before he met and fell in love with Hyun-ji.
 Kim So-hyun as Kim Hyun-ji
The female protagonist. A middle high-school student who, since a car accident when she was 19, has roamed the earth for five years as a wandering spirit. With no memory of her past, she is unable to move on. Discovering that Bong-pal may hold the secret to her past, she moves in with him and becomes his ghost-fighting partner. She can see how ghosts were killed, allowing her to help Bong-pal in dispelling them. Living and fighting, together and against each other, she falls in love with Bong-pal. 
 Kwon Yul as Joo Hye-sung
 Jang Ho-joon as young Hye-sung
The main antagonist. At 31, he is the youngest professor of veterinary medicine at Bong-pal's university. He has been possessed on his will by a powerful evil spirit for so long that it is almost impossible to discern the difference between the two. Before possessing Hye-sung, the spirit had tried to possess the young Bong-pal, and the fragment of the spirit that remains in Bong-pal is the reason he can see ghosts. Fearing a ritual weapon that can destroy him, and the spirit that possesses him, Hye-sung has stalked Bong-pal for years and was responsible for the death of his mother, a medium.

Supporting

People around Park Bong-pal
 Kim Sang-ho as Monk Myung-cheol
A 55-year-old Buddhist monk, he has been Bong-pal's spiritual protector since childhood.
  as Park Ji-hoon
Bong-pal's father. Bong-pal is estranged from his father, unaware that he has been trying to protect him.
 Son Eun-seo as Hong Myung-hee
Bong-pal's mother, a powerful medium, who died when Bong-pal was quite young.

Ghosts
 Lee Do-yeon as Oh Kyung-ja
The ghost of 32-year-old woman. Hyun-ji's friend, the two being ghosts together. Kyung-ja appears to be a "virgin ghost" common in Korean mythology, and follows handsome men around. We later on find out more about her back story.

Myungsung University
 Kang Ki-young as Choi Cheon-sang
A 26-year-old 3rd-year Physical Education student and the president of the university ghost-hunting club "Ghost Net".
 Lee David as Kim In-rang
A 25-year-old 3rd-year Computer and Information Science student and the vice-president of "Ghost Net".
Baek Seo-yi as Lim Seo-yeon
A 25-year-old, she is a 4th-year Economics student on whom Bong-pal has a crush.

Extended

  as Nurse Jung
A 27-year-old woman
  as Nurse Kim
A 24-year-old woman
  as Detective Yang
A 46-year-old man, he is a sergeant of Mapo Police Station criminal case, who is highly suspicious of Hye-sung for his connections of multiple murder cases.
  as Detective Kim
A 41-year-old man, he is the chief of Mapo Police Station criminal case
 
 Oh Ha-nui
  as Noh Hyun-joo
 Yoon Joo
 
 Lee Jeong-hyuk
 Kwon Ban-seok
 Hyun Jeong-cheol
 Kim Ji-eun as Freshman Kim Ji-eun
 Yoon Sung-won
 Yeom Ji-hye
 Son Seung-hee
 Kim Hyo-myung as union club president
 Seo Kwang-jae as monk Myung-cheol's acupuncturist friend
 Seo Jeong-ha
 Lee Ye-rim
  as dead child's grandmother
 Park Gyu-young as Lee Se-in
 Oh Eun-byul
 Kwon Ji-hwan
 Kim Sang-woo
 Lee Jin-mok
 Lee Min-sung
 Kwon Soon-joon
 Kang Min-ah as Kim Eun-sung
 Joo Boo-jin as guest house's grandmother
 Kim Do-yoon
 
 Choi Yoon-joon
 Kim Joon-won as detective
  as Hyun-min's younger brother
 
 Yook Mi-ra
 Park Geon
  as monk
  as doctor
  as Hyun-ji's father
 Park Jae-hong
 Ha Min
 Yoo An
 Ahn Soo-bin
 Lee Han-joo
 Han Ji-woon
 Im Jae-geun
 
 
 Kim Mi-hye
 Kim Hye-rim
 Jo Seon-mook
 Go Jin-young
 Lee Jae-soo
 Shin Dong-hoon
 Ahn Sung-geon
 Kang Ji-woo
 Lee Ho
 Choi Hyo-eun
 Kim So-yi
 Park Sung-gyun
 Kim Joo-young
 Park Dae-won
 Lee Dong-hee
 Jo Ah-jin
 Cha Min-hyuk
 Lee Jae-won
 Ahn Ye-eun
 Kim Soo-jeong
 Yang Ha-young

Special appearances

 Lee Se-young as ghost (Ep. 1)
 Choi Hong-man as ghost (Ep. 1)
 Shim Hyung-tak as teacher (Ep. 1, 5, 16)
 Woo Hyun as ghost (Ep. 1)
 Choi Go as a boy on the bus (Ep. 1)
 Lee Jung-eun as apartment's woman president (Ep. 2)
 Han Bo-reum as Miz (Ep. 3)
 Choi Dae-sung as sauna's owner (Ep. 4)
  as monk Myung-cheol's acquaintance (Ep. 5, 10–11, 15)
 Park Hyun-sook as Kim Eun-sung's mother (Ep. 7)
 Kim Ji-young as Kim In-rang's grandmother (Ep. 7)
 Choi Ji-na as Seo Jeong-geum – 48-year-old, Hyun-ji's mother (Ep. 7, 11)
  as national CSI's autopsy staff (Ep. 7, 10)
 Jin Yi-han as Hyun-min (Ep. 9, 10)
 Lee Soo-kyung as Shin Soo-kyung (Ep. 9, 10)
  as union club's secretary (Ep. 10)
 Kim Hee-won as detective (Ep. 12)
 Seo Hyun-jin as department store clerk (Ep. 13)
 Kwon Hyuk-soo as client (Ep. 16)
 Yoon Doo-joon as Goo Dae-young (Ep. 16)
 Kim Hyun-sook as shaman (Ep. 16)

Production
In March 2016, tvN announced that they would be adapting and producing a drama version of Hey Ghost, Let's Fight, a popular 2007–2010 manhwa by Im In-seu, under the same title. On April 27, Kim So-hyun's agency confirmed that she would join the drama, with male lead Ok Taec-yeon and Kwon Yul joining on May 4.

The first script reading was held on May 18, 2016, at CJ E&M Center in Sangam-dong, Seoul, South Korea. Episode 1 was aired on July 11, 2016, on tvN channel.

Episodes

Original soundtrack

Part 1

Part 2

Part 3

Part 4

Part 5

Part 6

Ratings
In this table, the  represent the lowest ratings and the  represent the highest.

International broadcast
 : Aired on DTV starting August 13, 2016, every day except Friday at 18:00 (AST), with Arabic subtitles.
 : Aired on 8TV starting August 25, 2016, on Thursdays & Fridays at 21:30 (MST).
 : It was aired on GMA Network since September 18, 2017, under the title Let's Fight Ghost.
 : Aired on Channel 8 starting August 25, 2016, on Saturdays and Sundays at 10:45 (THT).
 : Aired on cable network  starting January 23, 2017, on Mondays and Tuesdays at 20:00 (GMT+7)
 In South Asia, the series aired on tvN Asia under the title Hey Ghost, Let's Fight, within 24 hours of its original telecast.
 Hong Kong : It aired on ViuTV starting November 24, 2017, Mondays to Fridays at 20:30 (HKT) with a Cantonese Dub
 Taiwan: It aired on the Star Chinese Channel starting November 21 2016, Mondays to Fridays at 21:00 with a Taiwanese Mandarin Dub
 : Aired on NET. starting July 1, 2021, on Every day at 19:30 (WIB) under the title Let's Fight Ghost.

Adaptations
A Thai remake, titled Let's Fight Ghost was broadcast in Thailand in the first half of 2021 by True Asian Series, True4U, and NETFLIX; it stars Suppapong Udomkaewkanjana and Patchanan Jiajirachote of BNK48.

References

External links
 
 Hey Ghost, Let's Fight at Studio Dragon
 Hey Ghost, Let's Fight at Creative Leaders Group 8
 
 
 Hey Ghost, Let's Fight at Daum 
 Hey Ghost, Let's Fight at Naver Movies 

TVN (South Korean TV channel) television dramas
Korean-language television shows
2016 South Korean television series debuts
2016 South Korean television series endings
Television series about ghosts
Television shows about exorcism
South Korean fantasy television series
South Korean action television series
South Korean horror fiction television series
South Korean romantic comedy television series
South Korean college television series
South Korean television series remade in other languages
Television shows based on South Korean webtoons
Television series by Studio Dragon